Karasay batyr is a planned Line 1 station of Almaty Metro. The construction of the station is expected to start in 2019 and it will be located on Ashimov Street between Elibaev Street and Bayzak Batyr at the intersection of Abay Avenue and Momyshuly Street.

References

Almaty Metro stations
Railway stations scheduled to open in 2025